Final Examination is a 2003 American erotic horror thriller film which was directed by Fred Olen Ray (credited as Ed Raymond) and stars Kari Wührer, Brent Huff and Debbie Rochon.

Plot
A police officer fails in capturing a drug dealer in Los Angeles, so his boss Hugh Janus transfers him to Hawaii for disciplinary reasons. On the island some former female students are just gathering in a luxury hotel. The young ladies once belonged to the sorority "Omega Kappa Omega" and are now invited to an erotic photo shoot which is organised by Derek Simmons, the editor of the Cavalier Magazine. Shortly after their arrival, Terri Walker, one of the former students, is strangled in the pool while her friend William Culp is absent for some minutes. Detective Newman begins to investigate the murder together with his new colleague Julie Seska and the coroner Ferguson. Next to Terri's corpse they find a document which resembles a final examination certificate and has the imprint "Failed" on it. William tells them to observe Derek Simmons very closely.

In the following night, the next student dies. Amanda Calvin is lured outside to the pool by a phone call and falls victim to the unknown murderer. Later the cops find William in the hotel room of the student Megan Davidson, who also belongs to the group. They just had sex and now they are questioned. The cops get to know the background of the series of murders. Five years ago, Rachel Kincaid committed suicide by falling from a bridge in her car. At that time she was the favourite for the election of the sorority's speaker, but she was mobbed by her competitor Kristen Neal, who is also present in Hawaii now.

After Newman and Seska have clarified these connections, William wants to inform them about something. But before Newman meets him, the young man is killed by the murderer and can only indicate that there is some problem with Rachel. Newman again gets in contact with his colleague Rita in Los Angeles, who had already provided him with the file about Rachel, and asks for Simmons. Rita gets to know that the editor of the magazine is actually called James Derek Kincaid and that he is Rachel's brother. He has gathered the students in the hotel to take revenge for his sister's death.

Megan and Kristen, who are the only surviving people among the invited students, meet at the hotel room. It is the fifth anniversary of Rachel's suicide. Kristen suspects Megan and threatens her with a pistol. Suddenly the lights go out and she forces Megan to go into the hallway where she runs across the murderer. Kristen is able to expel the killer, but accidentally shoots at Seska. Newman just arrives in time to stop the killer who really proves to be Simmons alias Kincaid.

With the help of a photo, the detective realises that the case is not yet complete. As he has been intimate with the photographer Tayler Cameron before he recognizes her necklace. She is a sister of Rachel and Derek. Now she overwhelms Kristen and threatens to strangle her. When Newman intervenes, she escapes to a rock over the pool. She stabs a knife in her body and falls down into the water. The cop just wants to announce the next corpse, but she attacks him. Newman shoots Taylor in self-defense.

At the same time his colleagues in Los Angeles arrest professor Andrews, who was not only Rachel's study adviser, but also impregnated his student before she died. When they arrive at the police station, the cop Sam reveals to be another brother of Rachel. He shoots the professor.

Cast

 Kari Wührer as Julie Seska
 Brent Huff as Shane Newman
 Debbie Rochon as Taylor Cameron
 Amy Lindsay as Kristen Neal
 Belinda Gavin as Megan Davidson
 Ted Monte as Sam Kincaid
 Jim Valdez as Detective James
 Richard Gabai	as Ferguson
 Marc Vahanian	as Detective Marks
 Kathy Cullis as Miss Pratt
 Robert Donovan as Professor Andrews
 Kalau Iwaoka as Amanda Galvin
 Michael Lloyd	as Charlie Wilson
 Kim Maddox as Terri Walker
 Bill Langlois Monroe as Drug Dealer
 Winton Nicholson as Derek Simmons
 Jen Nikolaisen as Rachel Kincaid
 Tom Penny as Riley
 Jay Richardson as Hugh Janus
 Jade Rutane-Babey as Rita
 Jason Schnuit	as William Culp

Production
It was shot in the United States in summer 2002 in Hawaii and on Hawaii Kai in Honolulu in O'ahu. The slasher film videorecording was produced Royal Oaks Entertainment and directed by Fred Olen Ray (credited as Ed Raymond), as producers worked Hugh Jorgan, James Valdez. The film based on a screenplay from the writers Sean O'Bannon and Kimberly A. Ray.

Fred Olen Ray says there were two versions, one adult, and one for the family market. Andrew Stevens played a role in the family version, in order to maintain his Screen Actors Guild health insurance. Jay Richardson played the role (a detective) in the adult version.

Soundtrack
The score was composed by Thomas Barquee, record producer Steve Gurevitch and the brothers David Wurst and Eric Wurst.

Release & reception

The film premiered on 3 January 2003 as direct to video production. It was published and distributed by Artisan Home Entertainment in Santa Monica, California.

See also
 Final Exam, a 1981 horror film with a similar title

References

External links
 
 
 Final Examination on Rotten Tomatoes

2003 films
2003 horror films
2000s crime thriller films
2000s erotic thriller films
2000s exploitation films
2000s horror thriller films
2003 independent films
2000s serial killer films
2000s slasher films
American crime thriller films
American erotic thriller films
American horror thriller films
American independent films
American serial killer films
American slasher films
Artisan Entertainment films
Crime horror films
2000s English-language films
Erotic slasher films
Films directed by Fred Olen Ray
Films set in Hawaii
Films set in 2002
Franchise Pictures films
2000s American films